FOLR may refer to:

 FOLR1 (folate receptor 1, adult)
 FOLR2 (folate receptor 2, fetal)